Jay Preece (born May 21, 1981) is a professional box lacrosse goaltender for the Colorado Mammoth in the National Lacrosse League.

Career
Preece signed with the Philadelphia Wings prior to the 2007 NLL season after spending two seasons on the Toronto Rock practice squad. Prior to the 2009 NLL season, Preece signed as a free agent with the Colorado Mammoth. During the summers, Preece played in the Western Lacrosse Association with the Maple Ridge Burrards.

Statistics

NLL

References

1981 births
Canadian lacrosse players
Colorado Mammoth players
Lacrosse people from Ontario
Living people
Philadelphia Wings players
Sportspeople from Mississauga